Zoe Reynolds is a fictional case officer in the counterterrorism department of MI5, featured in the British television series Spooks, also known as MI5 in the United States. The character is played by Keeley Hawes. Prior to starting her job, Zoe studies for her degree at Oxford University; this is revealed to Danny Hunter when she is preparing to go undercover in the third episode of series two. One of her main talents is in linguistics, and she is shown translating Serbian dialogue in the first episode of series two.

Zoe is a junior case officer in Section D, which she joined shortly before September 1997, and is part of the original leading trio (along with Tom Quinn and Danny Hunter). At the end of the second episode of the show, she moves in with Danny and the two young spooks form a very strong bond. She also forms strong relationships with Harry Pearce (her boss and someone whom she respected a lot), and Ruth Evershed. Zoe is brilliant at her job and has excellent instincts and charm, which make her particularly suited to undercover work. One of her undercover roles leads to her dismissal from the service.

Throughout her career as a spook her confidence and morale take a big beating. She is distraught to find out that Tessa Phillips is corrupt, as she has admired Tessa greatly. This is made even worse by Zoe's being very much involved in her downfall. She goes through a similar hard time when Tom is alleged to be a rogue officer. Her confidence takes a bigger beating when she and the rest of the team manage to clear his name, only for him to be decommissioned in the next episode.

In series 3, Zoe gets engaged to a photographer named Will, which leads to tensions between her and Danny. In episode 6 of this series, Zoe is seen in court, charged with conspiracy to murder. When she is found guilty, Zoe is sentenced to 10 years in prison and is forced to abscond to Chile, without Will, to avoid being jailed. This leads to a very emotional goodbye between her and Danny. Later on, Danny, seeing how Will is suffering, reveals Zoe's fate, and Will leaves to rejoin her in Chile. The two later send Danny a postcard, with a picture hidden inside it of them together.

In the book Spooks: The Personnel Files, Zoe, accepting that she will never see Danny again, sets up a PO box for him to write back, and finally expresses her feelings for him. In the meantime, Zoe continues her life with Will, and at the time of writing the message, is pregnant with the child Zoe has always wanted. Zoe uses a tourist she befriended abroad to sneak the message back to Britain hidden inside a utility bill.

Sadly, the postcard arrives ten days after Danny was shot dead, so he never knows the depth of Zoe's affections. The postcard is instead re-routed to Danny's mother, and is subsequently intercepted by Special Branch and referred to MI5.

The postcard, with certain details redacted, is added to Zoe's closed file, as her identity and whereabouts must still be protected. Harry notes that Danny never knew the depth of Zoe's affections as a sad reminder of the price MI5 officers are required to suffer. The book Spooks: Harry's Diary confirms its existence, and both sources are considered canon to the storyline.

References

Television characters introduced in 2002
Spooks (TV series) characters
Fictional secret agents and spies